Darcy Roper (born 31 March 1998) is an Australian athlete specialising in the long jump. He won a bronze medal at the 2019 Summer Universiade. Earlier he won a bronze at the 2016 World U20 Championships and a Silver at the 2015 IAAF World youth Championships.

His personal best in the event is 8.20 metres (+1.4 m/s) set at the ACT State Championships 2020. He has also leapt a wind assisted 8.32 meters (+2.6 m/s) in Perth 2019.

International competitions

Best performances

References

1998 births
Living people
Australian male long jumpers
Universiade bronze medalists for Australia
Universiade medalists in athletics (track and field)
Medalists at the 2019 Summer Universiade